The Ming Dynasty Quality Handicap is an Australian Turf Club Group 3 Thoroughbred quality handicap horse race for three-year-olds, over a distance of 1400 metres at Rosehill Gardens Racecourse, Sydney, Australia. Total prizemoney for the race is A$200,000.

History
The race is named in honour of Ming Dynasty who won the Caulfield Cup and Australian Cup twice as well as the Chelmsford Stakes.

Name
1986–1992 - D. Drainsfield Quality Handicap
1993 - Laing & Simmons Quality Handicap
1994 - Ming Dynasty Quality Handicap

Grade
 1986–2012 - Listed Race
 2000–2004 - Group 3
 2005–2012 - Listed Race
 2013 onwards - Group 3

Venue
 1986–1999 - Randwick
 2000 - Rosehill  
 2001–2003 - Randwick
 2004 - Warwick Farm
 2005–2010 - Randwick
 2011–2012 - Warwick Farm
 2013–2016 - Randwick
 2017–2020 - Rosehill
 2021 - Kembla Grange Racecourse
 2022 - Rosehill

Distance
 1986–1994 – 1600 metres
 1995–1999 – 1400 metres
 2000 - 1350 metres
 2001 onwards - 1400 metres

Winners

 2022 - Golden Mile 
 2021 - Coastwatch 
 2020 - Holyfield 
 2019 - Quick Thinker 
 2018 - Danawi 
 2017 - Addictive Nature 
 2016 - Swear 
 2015 - Metallic Crown 
 2014 - Panzer Division 
 2013 - Aussies Love Sport 
 2012 - Tatra 
 2011 - Ambidexter 
 2010 - Lion Tamer 
 2009 - More Than Great 
 2008 - Predatory Pricer 
 2007 - †race not held
 2006 - Mearas  
 2005 - Primus   
 2004 - Dane Shadow    
 2003 - Play Around    
 2002 - Half Hennessy     
 2001 - Lonhro      
 2000 - Continuum       
1999 - Hire       
 1998 - Kenwood Melody       
 1997 - Adam       
 1996 - Magic Of Sydney       
 1995 - Follow Through       
 1994 - Obsessed       
 1993 - Matrinaman       
 1992 - Muirfield Village       
 1991 - Kinjite       
1990 - What A Hit
1989 - Cool Credit
1988 - Royal Pardon
1987 - Nickson
1986 - Imperial Majesty

† Not held because of outbreak of equine influenza

See also
 List of Australian Group races
 Group races

References

Horse races in Australia